Natalya Vladimirovna Sindeyeva (born June 11, 1971) is a Russian journalist, founder, main owner and chief executive officer of the Dozhd media holding, which includes the Dozhd TV channel, the Republic.ru online magazine and the  magazine. She is the co-founder and former general producer of the Silver Rain radio station, and founder of the  anti-award. She is also a three-times winner of the "Media Manager of Russia" prize, an honorary academician of the Russian Academy of Radio.

Early life and education 
Natalya Vladimirovna Sindeyeva was born in Michurinsk into the family of a military dentist. From the age of three, Natalya was transferred to the care of her grandparents. As a child, she was fond of sports, graduated from a ballet school, studied music and folk dances. After school she received a specialty "teacher of elementary grades and mathematics" at the Michurinsk State Pedagogical Institute (MGPI).

Career
After graduation in 1992, she moved to Moscow. In the beginning, she worked in an Italian clothing company and on a project for a night show on the water in the Chaika pool. Working as a promoter at one of the exhibitions, Sindeyeva met with producer Pavel Vashchekin and later became his personal assistant. In 1993, she moved to the 2x2 TV channel, where she worked her way up from secretary to producer of the Thousand and One Nights TV show.

While working on 2x2, Sindeyeva met her future husband . The couple started creating the FM radio station Silver Rain. While working on the radio, Sindeyeva met a Russian businessman and restaurateur Jamil Asfari, who became her second husband. In 2002, the couple had a son, Luca.

In 2005, at a match of the Chelsea football club, Sindeyeva met the banker , who was then the head of the investment bank . In 2006, she graduated from the Stockholm School of Economics Russia, course of business development Entrepreneur Essential 4. In 2006 Sindeyeva and Vinokurov married and in 2009, their daughter Alexandra, was born. Together with Vinokurov, who became the main investor, Sindeyeva created the Dozhd media holding.

Silver Rain, 1995–2009 
Together with her first husband, Dmitry Savitsky, Sindeyeva created the Silver Rain FM radio station. The first broadcast took place in 1995. Savitsky became the general director, and Sindeyeva became the general producer of the station and organizer of the anti-award for dubious achievements . Many journalists were brought to work at the radio station. In addition, Silver Rain gained an audience via the Internet and the concept of "music non-stop" was introduced by Sindeyeva. 

From 2002 to 2009, Natalya served as commercial director of Silver Rain, while retaining the position of general producer. After leaving the radio station, she remained its co-owner.

Dozhd media holding, 2007–present 
Since 2007, Natalya Sindeyeva has been developing the Dozhd media holding, which includes the channel of the same name, as well as the  publication and the  magazine. Aleksandr Vinokurov is an investor in all three projects, but legally Sindeyeva alone owns Republic and Big City; in the Dozhd channel she has 95% (another 5% for Vera Krichevskaya). The exact investment in the holding has not been disclosed, but by mid-2013, according to some estimates, the total investment in the channel alone could have reached $40 million.

In 2012, the total revenue of the holding amounted to 433 million rubles, according to Russian Accounting Standards. The TV channel accounted for almost 66% — 285 million rubles, the Slon.ru portal (created in 2009) — 20%, the rest – the magazine and website Bolshoi Gorod (acquired in 2010). No resource brings operating profit. In June 2014, plans were announced to combine all projects into one holding company and bring it to an IPO on the Moscow Exchange.

Dozhd became the most influential independent TV channel in Russia, always under pressure of the state authorities. It was declared a 'foreign agent' in 2021. Upon nation-wide crackdown of independent media in the country in time of the 2022 Russian invasion of Ukraine, the channel was blocked by Roskomnadzor. Sindeyeva announced on air on March 3, the current broadcast would be the last for the time being. The following day, a law against "fake news" (intended to criminalize comments from independent media sources) was passed in the Russian parliament.

Documentary

Personal life 

On February 2, 2020, Sindeyeva announced on air of her own program that she had been diagnosed with breast cancer.
Sindeeva is a passionate tango dancer.  She and Vinokurov are separated. She has been married three times and has two children, a son, Luka, and a daughter, Alexandra.

Awards
In 2004, Sindeyeva became a laureate of the Media Manager of Russia award in the Radio category — "for innovative and non-standard approaches to the station's off-air promo campaigns".

In 2016, Sindeyeva became a laureate of the Moscow Helsinki Group Prize for the Protection of Human Rights.

In 2021, she won the  award.

References 

1971 births
Living people
Russian publishers (people)
Media executives
Mass media owners
TV Rain
Stockholm School of Economics alumni
Russian mass media owners
Russian women journalists
Russian newspaper publishers (people)
Russian activists against the 2022 Russian invasion of Ukraine